The men's tandem was a track cycling event held as part of the Cycling at the 1964 Summer Olympics programme.  It was held on 21 October 1964 at the Hachioji Velodrome.  13 pairs competed.

Medalists

Results

Heats

The 13 pairs competed in 6 heats of 2 cyclists (one of 3) in the heats.  The winner of each heat advanced to the quarterfinals, with the defeated cyclists relegated to the repechage.

Repechage, eliminations

Three heats of two or three cyclists each were held, with the winner of each moving to the finals of the repechage while the other 4 cyclists were eliminated.

Repechage, finals

There was one heat of finals for the repechage, with the top two pairs advancing to the quarterfinals and the third pair eliminated.

Quarterfinals

The quarterfinals saw the 8 remaining pairs paired off into four heats.  The winner of each match, which was in a best-of-three format, advanced, the loser was eliminated.

Semifinals

The semifinals were also raced in a best-of-three format.  The winner of each semifinal advanced to the gold medal match, while the loser was sent to the bronze medal match. Germany initially won their semifinals against Italy, but were disqualified in the third race for moving out of their lane in the final sprint.

Finals

Sources

References

Cycling at the Summer Olympics – Men's tandem
Track cycling at the 1964 Summer Olympics